The Last Days of Frank and Jesse James is a 1986 American biographical Western television film directed by William A. Graham and starring Kris Kristofferson. The main cast is made up of country music all-stars, including Johnny Cash, June Carter Cash, David Alan Coe, Lecile Harris, Willie Nelson, and Marcia Cross.

Cast

References

External links
 
 

1986 television films
1980s English-language films
American Western (genre) television films
1980s biographical films
American biographical films
Biographical films about Jesse James
Films directed by William Graham (director)
Films scored by Paul Chihara
Films shot in Tennessee
NBC network original films
1980s American films